The Tamil languages are the group of Dravidian languages most closely related to Tamil. In addition to Tamil itself, they are:
 Irula, Betta Kurumba, Yerukala, Eravallan, Kanikkaran, Muthuvan, Sholaga, Kaikadi, Sankethi, Eezhavam,  Jaffnese

Arwi is not a separate language but a register of Tamil used by Muslims. It is written in the Arabic alphabet and contains many loans from Arabic.

Kakkala may be either a Tamil language or one of the Malayalam languages.

Internal classification
Glottolog classifies the Malayalam languages as follows:

References